Winter swimming is the activity of swimming during the winter season, typically in outdoor locations (open water swimming) or in unheated pools or lidos. In colder countries, it may be synonymous with ice swimming, when the water is frozen over. This requires either breaking the ice or entering where a spring prevents the formation of ice.

In Nordic countries of Europe as well in Eastern Europe (e.g. Ukraine, Russia, and Baltic countries), winter swimming is a traditional cultural element  and part of religious celebrations like the Epiphany in Eastern Orthodoxy.

Competitions for winter swimming also exist. Many winter swimmers swim with standard swimsuits rather than with wetsuits or other thermal protection. Famous ice and winter swimmers include Lynne Cox and Lewis Gordon Pugh.

Also, many locations in North America and Europe hold polar bear plunges, commonly to celebrate New Year's Day, although participants are not expected to swim and generally most do not swim.

International winter and ice swimming competitions take place around the world with two of the larger organizing bodies being the International Ice Swimming Association and the International Winter Swimming Association. Both organizations have similar competition guidelines including water temperatures typically below , a  pool often cut out of frozen bodies of water, and swimmers limited to goggles, one standard bathing suit, and one latex or silicone cap - neoprene is not allowed.

Maintaining the hole in the ice 

One way that the hole is maintained at regular ice swimming places is with a pump that forces the water to circulate under the hole, preventing ice from forming. Small ice-holes can also be kept open by keeping a lid/top over the hole to prevent ice forming.

Most ice swimming places also use a specific heated "carpet" going from the locker rooms to the ice-hole, both to make walking to the hole more pleasant and for safety as otherwise the water dripping from returning swimmers would freeze and create a dangerously slippery surface to walk on.

National traditions

Northern Europe 

In Denmark, Estonia, Finland, Latvia, Lithuania, Norway, Russia and Sweden the ice swimming tradition has been connected with the sauna and Banya traditions. Unlike dousing, it is not seen as an ascetic or religious ritual, but a way to cool off rapidly after staying in a sauna and as a stress relief.

Ice swimming (avantouinti) on its own is especially popular in Estonia and Finland. There is an Avantouinti Society, and swimming holes are also maintained by other groups such as the Finnish skiing association (Suomen Latu). The Finnish Sauna Society maintains an avanto for sauna goers.

There are many places to swim without sauna in Finland during winter. Helsinki has several places for avantouinti, with dressing rooms and sometimes with saunas. There is also a number of ice swimming and winter sauna locations around Tampere.

Oceania

Australia 
In New South Wales, the Bronte Splashers Winter Swimming Club claims to be the oldest Winter Swimming club in the world founded in 1921. It competes against Bondi Icebergs Winter Swimming Club, South Maroubra Dolphins Winter Swimming Club, Cronulla Polar Bears Winter Swimming Club, Maroubra Seals Winter Swimming Club, Coolangatta Surf Life Saving Club, Clovelly Eskimos Winter Swimming Club, Coogee Penguins Winter Swimming Club, Wollongong Whales and Cottesloe Crabs in the Winter Swimming Association of Australia Championships.

In Victoria, the Brighton Icebergers and the Shrinkäge swim group swim in Port Phillip Bay, the latter at Elwood Beach in Elwood

Western Europe

United Kingdom 

Famous locations include the Serpentine Lake in Hyde Park, London, and Highgate Ponds in Hampstead. The largest fresh water pool in the UK is the Tooting Bec Lido in South West London which is home to the South London Swimming Club. As the winter approaches and the water temperature drops then swimmers stay in for less and less time, swimming just one or two widths rather than several lengths. Races take place all year including on Christmas Day and New Year's Day.

The Middle Yeo Surf Life Saving Club hold the annual New Year's Day swim in Clevedon. It is usually held 20 minutes before high tide or if the times are not conducive to a large crowd the swim is held in Marine Lake. The Middle Yeo Surf Life Saving Club swim every weekend of the year and the forthcoming swim times are published in their alcove in Top Beach, Clevedon.

The Chester Frosties are an informal Facebook group of over 1,000 swimmers who swim all year around Cheshire, Lancashire, Wirral, Merseyside and North Wales. Local specialities include tidal bore and surge swimming on the River Dee.

Sheffield Outdoor Plungers are another informal Facebook group of 3,000 swimmers who swim in locations all over the Peak District and Sheffield area, and campaign for better access to waters.

Belgium 

There are some clubs where people swim all year in a pool, a lake, or a river. Locations are Bruges, Boom, Deurne Dendermonde, Wachtebeek, Theux and Huy. The most famous race is across the Meuse each last Sunday of February since 1963.

Germany 

The International Ice Swimming Association hosts an official ice swimming event at the Wöhrsee, a lake in Burghausen.

Switzerland 
In Geneva the yearly Coupe de Noël is an event organized in December since 1934. Around 2,500 participants, many of them dressed up, swim  in Lake Geneva.

The Netherlands

In Scheveningen there is a yearly event known as the "Nieuwjaarsduik" or New year's dive in English. In which people swim in the freezing North sea. Participants range in the thousands.

China 
There are reportedly 141 winter swimming organisations across China with a membership of more than 200,000. The younger swimmers are under ten years of age and the older ones in their 80s. In Beijing, there are the winter swimming places such as Shichahai (什刹海), Yu Yuantan (玉渊潭) and Xihu swimming pool in Qinghua University, etc.

In Harbin, northern China, many ice swim in the Songhua River. Also Jinan is a place of annual winter swimming festival. In Taiyuan, where air temperature often goes below  in winter, hundreds of men and women ice swim each day in the Fen River.

In Dalian, a coastal city in northeast China, hundreds of people swim in the sea in winter. Most people choose to go to the beach at noon. Some of them are concentrated in several beaches in the city, such as Fujiazhuang beach, Xinghai Square beach and Shicao beach. At Bangchuidao Island beach, there are also some swimmers who choose to go swimming in the sea before sunrise.

Jinan is also the site of annual Chinese national winter swimming festivals since 2014, as an international invitational festival (in 2019 attended by approx. 990 winter swimmers from 12 countries, still according Chinese rules) since 2016, and, from season 2019/2020, as the International Winter Swimming Association (IWSA) 3rd stage of World Cup already according to IWSA international rules. Besides competitions in swimming pool created in lake the main event and longest discipline of competitions is swimming 300 m (980 ft) from Huxin Island to the venue of the World Cup.

Eastern Europe and Russia 

In Russia ice swimming may have been practiced since pagan times. During the times of Moscovian Russia swimming in ice holes was a popular tradition. Records are dating the tradition back to as early as 1525. It was also an important court ceremony and a folk custom in Tsardom of Russia.

In Russia and other Eastern European countries where Eastern Orthodox Christianity is the prevalent religion ice swimming is connected with the celebration of the Epiphany. The Epiphany is observed on 19 January according to the Julian calendar of the Russian Orthodox Church. The day marks the baptism of Jesus in the River Jordan. To celebrate this, holes are cut in the ice on rivers, lakes or other bodies of water, usually in the form of a Christian or Orthodox cross. Around midnight, believers submerge themselves three times in the water to honour the Holy Trinity, after a priest says a prayer.

Ice swimming on the Epiphany is relatively new. It was practised by only a few before the October Revolution of 1917 and occurred even less frequently in the time of the Soviet Union, when Christians were persecuted. However, the ritual became very popular in the 1990s since the Dissolution of the Soviet Union. In Moscow alone, 30,000 believers swam in ice holes in 37 fonts during the Epiphany of 2010. There is a popular belief that the practice erases a person's sins, but this is not endorsed by the Russian Orthodox Church. On the holiday in January 2020, 2 million people practised ice swimming in Russia for the baptism of Jesus.

Ice swimming is also practised during the entire winter by Walrus Clubs, whose members are called "walruses" ("morzhi"). In other Eastern European countries such as Bulgaria and Romania, the Epiphany is celebrated on 6 January. There it is tradition for Orthodox priests to cast wooden crosses in the water, which are then retrieved by the believers. It is popularly believed that the person who finds the cross is freed from evil spirits. Other countries where this is done include Serbia and Montenegro.

North America 

The members of Canadian and American "polar bear clubs" go outdoor bathing or swimming in the middle of winter. In some areas, it is unusual or ceremonial enough to attract press coverage. "Polar bear plunges" are conducted as fund-raisers for charity, notably the Special Olympics, however these events don't actually involve swimming, but rather running into the water and back out again. Cosmo Kramer briefly joins a New York polar bears club in the sitcom Seinfeld.

The Russian immigrant professor Louis Sugarman of Little Falls, NY was the first American to become a famous ice swimmer in the 1890s. He attracted worldwide attention for his daily plunge in the Mohawk River, even when the thermometer hit , earning him the nickname "the human polar bear". 

The oldest ice swimming club in the United States is the Coney Island Polar Bear Club of Coney Island, New York, founded in 1903 by Bernarr MacFadden. The club organizes an annual polar plunge on New Year's Day as well as regular swims in the Atlantic Ocean every Sunday from November to April.

Health risks 

Winter swimming can be dangerous to people who are not used to swimming in very cold water. After immersion in cold water the cold shock response will occur, causing an uncontrollable gasp for air. This is followed by hyperventilation, a longer period of more rapid breathing. The gasp for air can cause a person to ingest water, which leads to drowning. As blood in the limbs is cooled and returns to the heart, this can cause fibrillation and consequently cardiac arrest. The cold shock response and cardiac arrest are the most common causes of death related to cold water immersion.

Winter swimming is not dangerous for healthy persons, but should be avoided by individuals with heart or respiratory diseases, high blood pressure and arrhythmia, as well as children and the elderly. Through conditioning, experienced winter swimmers have a greater resistance to effects of the cold shock response.

Hypothermia poses a smaller risk. According to Tucker and Dugas, it takes more than approximately 30 minutes even in  water until the body temperature drops low enough for hypothermia to occur. Many people would probably be able to survive for almost an hour. There is no consensus on these figures however; according to different estimates a person can survive for 45 minutes in  water, but exhaustion or unconsciousness is expected to occur within 15 minutes. Consuming alcohol before winter swimming should be avoided because it speeds the onset and progression of hypothermia.

Care should be taken when winter swimming in swimming pools and seas near the polar regions. The chlorine added to water in swimming pools and the salt in seawater allow the water to remain liquid at sub-zero temperatures. Swimming in such water is significantly more challenging and dangerous. The experienced winter swimmer Lewis Gordon Pugh swam near the North Pole in  water and suffered a frostbite injury in his fingers. It took him four months to regain sensation in his hands.

Health benefits 

Although there are risks associated with the practice, scientific studies also provide some evidence for the following health benefits.

When compared to a control group on the profile of mood states rating scale, winter swimmers experience less stress and fatigue and more vigor. They report to have a better memory function, better mood and feel more energetic, active and brisk. Swimmers who suffer from rheumatism, fibromyalgia or asthma report that winter swimming relieves pain.

There are indications that winter swimmers do not contract diseases as often as the general population. The incidence of infectious diseases affecting the upper respiratory tract is 40% lower among winter swimmers when compared to a control group. Short term exposure of the whole body to cold water produces oxidative stress, which makes winter swimmers develop improved antioxidative protection.

See also 
 Apetor
 Ice bath
 Boxing Day Dip
 Cold water dousing
 Polar bear plunge
 Stunt swimming

References

External links 

Swimming
Winter sports
Open water swimming
Bathing
Winter swimming